Brian Gill Ellwood (1925–2007), was a South African international lawn bowler.

Bowls career
He won a bronze medal in the pairs with Tommy Harvey at the 1972 World Outdoor Bowls Championship in Worthing. He also won a silver medal in the team event (Leonard Trophy).

He won the 1967 singles title at the South African National Bowls Championships when bowling for the Berea Park Bowls Club. In addition he won the Transvaal singles twice and the Northern Transvaal singles five times.

Personal life
He was a bank inspector by trade in addition to being a competent tennis and cricket player.

References

1925 births
2007 deaths
South African male bowls players